The High Point Panthers Men's Lacrosse team is a college lacrosse team that represents High Point University in High Point, North Carolina, United States. The school's teams are typically members of the Big South Conference, but due to the Big South not sponsoring lacrosse, the HPU men's lacrosse team has had to play as associate members of other conferences. It had played in the Atlantic Sun Conference, now known as the ASUN Conference, in the 2014 season, moving to the Southern Conference (SoCon) after that season when the SoCon took over operation of the ASUN men's lacrosse league. The Panthers remained in SoCon men's lacrosse through the 2022 season, after which they moved men's lacrosse to the newly established league of the Atlantic 10 Conference (A-10).

The High Point University Athletics department announced the school was adding men's lacrosse as its 16th varsity sport on September 17, 2010. Two months later, Jon Torpey was announced as the first head coach in program history.

History

Conference affiliations
 Independent (2013)
 Atlantic Sun (2014)
 SoCon (2015–2022)
 A-10 (2023–present)

Year by year results
{| class="wikitable"

All-time coaching records

External links

References

Atlantic 10 Conference men's lacrosse
College men's lacrosse teams in the United States